Waterford is a village in Racine County, Wisconsin, United States. The population was 5,542 at the 2020 census.

Geography

Climate
Waterford experiences four distinct seasons, with wide variations in precipitation and temperature.

Demographics

2018 census

As of the census of 2018, there were 5,571 people, 2,171 households. The population density was 2266.05 people/mi.  The racial makeup of the village was 93.99% White, 0.54% Black or African American, 0.00% Native American, 01.59% Asian, 2.69% from other races, and 1.19% from two or more races. 3.4% of the population were Hispanic or Latino of any race. There are 3,861 adults, 50.22% of the population being female and 49.78% being male. The median age of the males is 36.1 compared to the median age of females, which is 41 years old.

There were 2,171 households in the village, with an average size of 2.61 people per household. The homeowner vacancy rate was 0.4%, with a median rent of $938/month. The median house has 5.4 rooms, and has a value of $194,500. Out of the 2,171 households, 61.5% belongs to married couples, 3.5% to single males, 6.1% to single females and 29% to non-families. The median income for households in Waterford, Wisconsin is $77,973, while the mean household income is $85,805.

Of the 5,571 people, 0.80% have an education level of less than 9th grade, 5.40% are 9th to 12th grade, 33.74% are a high school graduate, 20.83% have some college education, 11.11% have an associate degree, 22.71% have a bachelor's degree, and 5.40% have a graduate degree.

2000 census
At the 2000 census there were 4,048 people, 1,561 households, and 1,139 families in the village. The population density was 1,645.1 people per square mile (635.3/km). There were 1,628 housing units at an average density of 661.6 per square mile (255.5/km).  The racial makeup of the village was 98.15% White, 0.27% Black or African American, 0.22% Native American, 0.20% Asian, 0.42% from other races, and 0.74% from two or more races. 1.88% of the population were Hispanic or Latino of any race.
Of the 1,561 households 36.9% had children under the age of 18 living with them, 59.8% were married couples living together, 9.0% had a female householder with no husband present, and 27.0% were non-families. 21.9% of households were one person and 8.5% were one person aged 65 or older. The average household size was 2.59 and the average family size was 3.03.

The age distribution was 28.4% under the age of 18, 5.7% from 18 to 24, 32.7% from 25 to 44, 21.2% from 45 to 64, and 12.1% 65 or older. The median age was 35 years. For every 100 females, there were 97.3 males. For every 100 females age 18 and over, there were 96.5 males.

The median household income was $55,804 and the median family income  was $64,453. Males had a median income of $44,417 versus $27,917 for females. The per capita income for the village was $22,741. About 0.9% of families and 3.0% of the population were below the poverty line, including 0.6% of those under age 18 and 7.2% of those age 65 or over.

Notable residents
Sam Alvey, mixed martial artist
 Charlie Ganzel, born in Waterford, major league baseball player
 Barbara Lawton, lieutenant governor of Wisconsin
 Walter J. Rush, Wisconsin state senator
 Lynn E. Stalbaum, U.S. representative
 Victor Willard, Wisconsin state senator

See also
 List of villages in Wisconsin

References

External links

 
 The Waterford Area Local History Collection University of Wisconsin Digital Collections Center
 Sanborn fire insurance map: 1911

Villages in Racine County, Wisconsin
Villages in Wisconsin